Tom Leonard (born July 15, 1948) is a former professional tennis player from the United States. (His mother Joanne Dunn played at Forrest Hills in 1943)

Leonard enjoyed most of his tennis success while playing as a Junior.
Finalist - National Hardcourts Burlingame, Ca  1966 (Singles)
Finalist - National Clay Courts Louisville, Kentucky  1966 (Singles)
Finalist - US Nationals (Jr.)
Kalamazoo, Michigan 1966 (Singles)
Finalist - US National (Jr.) 
Kalamazoo, Michigan 1966 (Doubles)
Winner - National Jaycees (Jr.)
Tampa, Fl   (Singles)
Played on the National Junior Davis Cup Team 1966, 1967, 1968,& 1969.
Started playing professionally with World Championship Tennis (Started by Lamar Hunt) from 1971 (as a substitute for Roy Emerson) until 1974. Hated traveling - so retired in 1974.

Started playing again professionally in 1977 on the minor circuits to get ranking high enough to play on the major circuit again. Played Wimbledon in 1978 - lost in the round of 16 to Tom Okker. Retired again in 1979 due to major ankle injury.

Grand Prix finals

Doubles (1 win, 3 losses)

ATP Challenger finals

Doubles (1 win, 2 losses)

External links
 
 

American male tennis players
Sportspeople from Carlsbad, California
Sportspeople from Des Moines, Iowa
Stanford Cardinal men's tennis players
Tennis people from California
Tennis people from Iowa
1948 births
Living people